Ryan Shupe & the RubberBand is an American country music and bluegrass group founded in the mid-1990s in Ogden, Utah. The band's current lineup comprises Ryan Shupe (fiddle, guitar, ukulele, mandolin, lead vocals), Roger Archibald (guitar, vocals), Craig Miner (banjo, bouzouki, mandolin, guitar, vocals), Josh Larsen (bass guitar, string bass, vocals), and Nate Young (drums, vocals). After recording four studio albums on their own independent record label, Ryan Shupe & The RubberBand were signed to Capitol Records in 2005. Their first album for Capitol, 2005's Dream Big, produced a Top 40 hit on the U.S. Billboard Hot Country Songs charts in its title track.  The second single from the album, however, failed to chart, and the band was dropped from Capitol.  In 2008, the band signed to Montage Music Group and released the album Last Man Standing.  After this, the band continued to tour nationally and promote their unique brand of music.  In 2010, the band released the album "Brand New Shoes" on their own independent label.  This album has many crowd favorites and highlights the cross-genre, acousti-jam sound they have become known for.  The band is currently promoting their new album "We Rode On" which leans more into the rock side of their musical arsenal and have released three videos to promote the upcoming release.  These videos are for the songs The Sun Will Shine Again, We Rode On, and Just Say Yes.

Formation and ideology 
Ryan Shupe started playing the fiddle at age 5. He played in various musical groups growing up starting with a group of talented 10 yr olds called the "PeeWee Pickers" who toured nationally. His experiences in bands forming and then breaking up led him to the concept of a "rubber band". It would be elastic in members being able to rotate in and out without a name change or breaking a groove. Since their formation they have become one of the most successful musical acts from the state of Utah among other acts such as SHeDAISY, Peter Breinholt, and Neon Trees. The band also made an appearance on the show Extreme Makeover: Home Edition on October 18, 2006, for a family in Logan, Utah.

Sound
Though the band has played in traditionally country venues and festivals all over the United States (such as the Telluride Music Festival and Nashville, TN)  their music draws from various influences such as bluegrass and rock as well. They have been described as "a mix between Dave Matthews Band and Dixie Chicks without the political agenda."

Discography

Albums

Singles

Music videos

References

External links
Official Ryan Shupe website

How to dream big?

American country music groups
Musical groups from Utah
Capitol Records artists
Montage Music Group artists
Musical groups established in 1996
1996 establishments in Utah